The 1968–69 Connecticut Huskies men's basketball team represented the University of Connecticut in the 1968–69 collegiate men's basketball season. The Huskies completed the season with a 5–19 overall record. The Huskies were members of the Yankee Conference, where they ended the season with a 3–7 record. The Huskies played their home games at Hugh S. Greer Field House in Storrs, Connecticut, and were led by second-year head coach Burr Carlson.

Schedule 

|-
!colspan=12 style=""| Regular Season

Schedule Source:

References 

UConn Huskies men's basketball seasons
Connecticut
Connecticut Huskies men's basketball team
Connecticut Huskies men's basketball team